The 2008-09 Libyan Cup is the 19th edition of the competition since its inception in 1976.

Rules
45 teams will be entering the competition, composed of 5 sides from the Libyan Third Division, and 40 sides from the Libyan Second Division. 26 were drawn into the First Round, while the other 18 were automatically drawn into the Second Round. The sides participating in the First Round were drawn into regional groups. The Second Round will consist of 32 sides, 18 in the Eastern Section, and 14 in the Western Section. 16 sides from the Second Round will go through to the Round of 32, where they will be joined by the 16 sides in the Libyan Premier League. All ties this season will be one-off ties, compared to previous seasons, where the later rounds were two-legged affairs.

If any of the matches end in a draw, then the tie(s) will be settled by a penalty shootout. This stands until the semi-final stage, where the tie(s) will be settled by two 15-minute halves of extra time, then followed by a penalty shootout if the scores remain level.

First round

Second round

Round of 32

The draw was made on March 26, 2009 at 22:00 EET. Matches will be settled by a penalty shootout immediately after the match should a tie end in a draw. The stadia were selected by the Libyan Football Federation. The ties will be played between May 1, 2009 and May 6, 2009. If ties are won by the team playing at home, then this team will play away from home against their next opponents in the Round of 16.

Round of 16

The draw was made on May 23, 2009 at 22:00 EET. Matches will be settled by a penalty shootout immediately after the match should a tie end in a draw. The stadia were selected by the Libyan Football Federation.

Ties to be played week commencing May 31, 2009

Quarter-finals
The draw was made on June 22, 2009 at the LFF headquarters in Tripoli. The ties will be played over three days commencing June 30, 2009.

Semifinals

The draw was made on June 30. The ties will be played over July 5 and July 6.

Final

References

 
Libyan Football Cup
Cup